Battle River is a river in central Alberta and western Saskatchewan. It is a major tributary of the North Saskatchewan River.
 
The mean discharge is 10 m³/s at its mouth.

History 
The river did not gain its current name until relatively recently. When Anthony Henday passed through the region in the 1750s, he did not mention a river with this name. But by 1793 Peter Fidler mentions arriving at the "Battle or Fighting River", likely so named because of the beginning of a period of rivalry between the Iron Confederacy (Cree and Assiniboine) and the Blackfoot Confederacy.

Course

The headwaters of Battle River is Battle Lake in west-central Alberta, east of Winfield. The river meanders through Alberta eastward into Saskatchewan, where it discharges into the North Saskatchewan River at Battleford. Over its course, the river flows through Ponoka and by Hardisty and Fabyan within Alberta. The Fabyan Trestle Bridge crosses the river.

Tributaries
Sunny Creek
Wolf Creek
Pigeon Lake Creek
Stoney Creek
Pipestone Creek
Driedmeat Creek
Meeting Creek
Paintearth Creek
Castor Creek
Iron Creek
Ribstone Creek

Battle Lake, Samson Lake, Driedmeat Lake and Big Knife Lake are formed along the river, and numerous other lakes (such as Pigeon Lake, Coal Lake, Bittern Lake, Vernon Lake, Ernest Lake, Soda Lake) lie in the Battle River hydrographic basin.

See also
List of rivers of Alberta
List of rivers of Saskatchewan
Battle River No. 438, Saskatchewan, rural municipality

References

External links
Battle River Watershed Alliance - designated Watershed Planning and Advisory Council
Fish Species of Saskatchewan

Rivers of Alberta
North Saskatchewan River
Tributaries of Hudson Bay